Michael Crawford Chapman, A.S.C. (November 21, 1935 – September 20, 2020) was an American cinematographer and film director well known for his work on many films of the American New Wave of the 1970s and in the 1980s with directors such as Martin Scorsese and Ivan Reitman. 
He shot more than forty feature films, over half of those with only three different directors.

Early life and education
Chapman was born in New York City in 1935, but raised in Wellesley, Massachusetts, a suburb of Boston, without much of an interest in film. As a youth, he was more interested in sports than photography or painting. After high school, he attended Columbia University, where he majored in English. Upon his graduation, he worked temporarily as a brakeman for the Erie Lackawanna Railroad in the Midwest and then served a brief stint in the United States Army.

Chapman’s father-in-law, Joe Brun, got him his first job in the industry: working as an assistant camera and focus puller on commercials, as there weren’t enough feature films being shot in New York at the time.

Career
Chapman began his film career as a camera operator, distinguishing himself on Francis Ford Coppola's The Godfather (1972) and Steven Spielberg's Jaws (1975). before making the leap to cinematographer. He fondly remembered his time as an operator, and called it one of the best jobs in the movie business because "you get to see the film before anyone else does!"

As a cinematographer, he became known for his two collaborations with Martin Scorsese: Taxi Driver (1976) and Raging Bull (1980). Chapman was also cinematographer for the remake of Invasion of the Body Snatchers (1978). He and Scorsese were huge fans of The Band, and Chapman served as the principal cinematographer for their documentary on The Band, called The Last Waltz (1978). With nine cameras shooting at once, Chapman remembered that “the strategy for filming all of their songs was planned out in enormous detail.”

Chapman's style tended to feature high contrasts and an aggressive use of strong colors. He was also adept at setting up complex camera movements quickly and improvising on the set. This style was epitomized in the boxing sequences in Raging Bull, during which the camera was often strapped to an actor through improvised rigs. His bold use of black-and-white cinematography on Raging Bull proved particularly difficult and earned Chapman his first Academy Award nomination. As with his work on Jaws, Chapman used a handheld camera to shoot much of the film.

Besides his work with Scorsese, Chapman worked as Director of Photography for directors Hal Ashby, Philip Kaufman, Martin Ritt, Robert Towne, Michael Caton-Jones, Andrew Davis, and Ivan Reitman. He occasionally made small cameos in films that he shot; he had also directed several films of his own, the best known being All the Right Moves (1983), starring Tom Cruise in one of his earliest roles.

In 1987, Chapman collaborated again with Scorsese on the 18-minute short film that served as the music video for Michael Jackson’s Bad.

Chapman also shot a string of comedies in the late 1980s and early 1990s, such as Ghostbusters II and Kindergarten Cop, and admitted that he didn’t need to alter his style very much. But he has said, “On comedies, I use a little more fill light; you tend to create a lit atmosphere where the performers can be at home, where they can move around…without having to hit a precise mark." He became a member of the American Society of Cinematographers (ASC) in 1995.

His final film was Bridge to Terabithia (2007). According to the DVD commentary, Chapman planned to retire after the film was finished, saying he would like to have the last film he shot be a good one.

Personal life 
Chapman was married to screenwriter Amy Holden Jones. His father-in-law, Joe Brun, was an Oscar-nominated cinematographer who had emigrated from France in the early 20th century.

He stated later in his life that he no longer watched films directed by frequent collaborators Martin Scorsese or Steven Spielberg, as he knew their general style will not change much. "Unless a director makes some huge sea change in what he does, that the work, the mechanical work, is going to be vaguely the same — or of the same school, anyway — but what changes is the intelligence and passion behind it in the script." He also admitted his preferred method was to watch movies at his home and that he rarely, if ever, went to a theater any more.

Death
Chapman died from congestive heart failure on September 20, 2020, at his home in Los Angeles.

Awards and nominations
Chapman was nominated twice for the Academy Award for Best Cinematography: for Raging Bull and The Fugitive. He was the winner of the National Society of Film Critics Award for Best Cinematography in 1981 for his work on Raging Bull. He received the 2003 ASC Lifetime Achievement Award. Chapman received the Lifetime Achievement Award at the 24th International Film Festival of the Art of Cinematography Camerimage in 2016.

Filmography

As director

Other works

References

Bibliography
 Silberg, Jon. "Honoring a (Reluctant) Vanguard." American Cinematographer Feb. 2004: ASC. Print.
 "Announcing the 2016 Camerimage Lifetime Achievement Award Recipient." Camerimage. Web. 14 Nov. 2016.
 "ASC Awards for Outstanding Achievement in Cinematography." The American Society of Cinematographers. Web. 15 Nov. 2016.
 Lodderhose, Diana. "Cinematographer Michael Chapman Honored at Camerimage Film Festival." Variety. 6 July 2016. Web. 16 Nov. 2016.
 Newman, Nick. "Michael Chapman Talks Restoring ‘Taxi Driver’ and the Problem with Modern Cinematography." The Film Stage. 17 Nov. 2016. Web. 20 Nov. 2016.
 Orr, John, and Olga Taxidou. Post-war Cinema and Modernity: A Film Reader. New York: New York UP, 2001. Print.
 "Past Awards." National Society of Film Critics. 30 Aug. 2015. Web. 14 Nov. 2016.

External links

Michael Chapman tells his life story at Web of Stories
Michael Chapman on Taxi Driver

1935 births
2020 deaths
American cinematographers
American male film actors
Columbia College (New York) alumni
Film directors from New York City
Male actors from New York City
Military personnel from New York City
United States Army personnel